The Snub-nose Painter (Italian: Pittore dei nasi camusi) ( 4th century BC) was an Apulian pottery painter so named for his distinctive manner of painting the noses of his subjects.

Followers include the Laterza Painter and the Painter of the Truro Pelike.

Works
 Column-krater, 
 Oinochòe with trilobate mouth, 
 Bell-shaped krater, Museo archeologico provinciale Sigismondo Castromediano (n. 4811)
 Oinochòe with trilobate mouth, Vatican
 Column-krater, Archeological Civic Museum (MCA) of Bologna

Bibliography 
 L. Laurenzi, C. V. A., Bologna, III, 1936, IV Dr, tav. 17, pp. 3–4
 M. Bernardini, in Atti del II Congresso Stor. Pugliese e del Congresso Internaz. di Studi Salentini, Bari 1952, pp. 19–20
 A. D. Trendall, Vasi antichi dipinti del Vaticano, Vasi italioti ed etruschi a figure rosse, II, Città del Vaticano 1955, p. 189 ss
 M. Bernardini, in Not. Scavi, 1957, p. 418
 B. M. Scarfì, Due pittori àpuli della seconda metà del IV secolo a. C., in Arch. Class., XI, 1959, pp. 185–188
 B. M. Scarfì, Scavi nella zona di Monte Sannace, in Mon. Ant. Lincei, vol. XLV, 1960, c. 167 ss

Notes 

Ancient Greek vase painters